Holton Wood is a  biological Site of Special Scientific Interest east of Oxford in Oxfordshire.

This ancient wood was formerly part of Bernwood Forest, which was a medieval hunting forest. It is semi-natural coppice with standards, with fine oak standards of varying ages. It has a rich invertebrate fauna, including 27 species of butterfly, with uncommon species such as white admiral and purple emperor.

References

 
Sites of Special Scientific Interest in Oxfordshire